A springboard injunction is a specific type of court order issued under English and Welsh law, which is typically used to prevent a former employee from misusing their former employer's confidential information. It potentially has relevance in other jurisdictions.

The classic, albeit very wide, definition of the springboard injunction was given by Roxburgh J in Terrapin Ltd v Builders' Supply Co (Hayes) Ltd [1967] RPC 375, namely that it is an injunction whereby a party is: "placed under a special disability in the field of competition in order to ensure that he does not get an unfair start". The underlying legal principle is referred to in this case as the "springboard principle", and in the later Attorney-General v Observer Ltd. case (1990) as the "springboard doctrine". Unlike other forms of injunction, its purpose is to prevent a person gaining an unfair advantage as a result of earlier unlawful activity, not preventing future unlawful activity.

In recent years  however the springboard injunction has been confined to cases where former employees threaten to abuse confidential information acquired during the currency of their employment. In an employment context a leading case is that of Roger Bullivant v. Ellis, which arose because Mr Ellis, Bullivant’s managing director, had taken confidential information with him when he left the company to set up a rival business.

Requirements
Springboard injunctions must meet the pre-requisite conditions that are standard for the granting of injunctions, however, there are additional criteria that the court must be satisfied with before this particular type of relief will be awarded:

 There must be a misuse of confidential information by the former employee and/or past breaches of contract by either the former employee or others they might be acting in concert with (UBS Wealth Management (UK) Ltd & Another v Vestra Wealth LLP & Oth [2008] EWHC 1974 ). 
 The former employee(s) must have an unfair advantage as a result of the breaches of contract and the unfair advantage must still exist at the time the injunction is sought (Sun Valley Foods Ltd v Vincent [2000] FSR 825).
 There must be a risk of future economic loss to the former employer which is caused by the former employee's unfair advantage.
 The sole and intended purpose of the injunction is to protect against future losses; not to punish previous breaches by the former employee.
 The seriousness of the breach of the former employee's conduct cannot have any bearing on the period for which the injunction should be granted. The court will only consider the effect of the breach upon the former employer in the sense of the extent to which the former employee has gained as an illegitimate advantage (Sectrack NV v Satamatics Ltd [2007] EWHC 3003).

Duration
A springboard advantage cannot last indefinitely and therefore a springboard injunction usually applies for a specific period. In the Bullivant case referred to above, the injunction was applied "until judgment or further order".

References 

English law